The population of Australia is estimated to be  as of   . Australia is the 55th most populous country in the world and the most populous Oceanian country. Its population is concentrated mainly in urban areas, particularly on the Eastern, South Eastern and Southern seaboards, and is expected to exceed 30 million by 2029.

Australia's population has grown from an estimated population of between 300,000 and 1,000,000 Indigenous Australians at the time of British colonisation in 1788 due to numerous waves of immigration during the period since. Also due to immigration, the European component's share of the population rose sharply in the late 18th and 19th centuries, but is now declining as a percentage.

Australia has an average population density of  persons per square kilometre of total land area, which makes it one of the most sparsely populated countries in the world. This is generally attributed to the semi-arid and desert geography of much of the interior of the country. Another factor is urbanisation, with 89% of its population living in a handful of urban areas, Australia is one of the world's most urbanised countries. The life expectancy of Australia in 2015–2017 was 83.2 years, among the highest in the world.

Cities

Australia contains five cities (including their suburbs) that consist of over one million people. Most of Australia's population live close to coastlines.

Ancestry

The earliest accepted timeline for the first arrivals of indigenous Australians to the continent of Australia places this human migration to at least 65,000 years ago, most probably from the islands of Indonesia and New Guinea.

Captain James Cook claimed the east coast for Great Britain in 1770; the west coast was later settled by Britain also. At that time, the indigenous population was estimated to have been between 315,000 and 750,000, divided into as many as 500 tribes speaking many different languages.

Between 1788 and the Second World War, the vast majority of settlers and immigrants came from the British Isles (principally England, Ireland and Scotland), although there was significant immigration from China and Germany during the 19th century. In the decades immediately following the Second World War, Australia received a large wave of immigration from across Europe, with many more immigrants arriving from Southern and Eastern Europe than in previous decades. Since the end of the White Australia policy in 1973, Australia has pursued an official policy of multiculturalism, and there has been a large and continuing wave of immigration from across the world, with Asia being the largest source of immigrants in the 21st century.

The Australian Bureau of Statistics no longer collects data on race, but does ask each Australian resident to nominate up to two ancestries each census. These ancestry responses are classified into broad standardised ancestry groups. In the 2021 census, the most commonly nominated individual ancestries as a proportion of the total population were: 

At the 2021 census, 3.2% of the Australian population identified as being Indigenous — Aboriginal Australians and Torres Strait Islanders. In 2020, 7.5% of births were Aboriginal and Torres Strait Islander persons up from 5.7% in 2010; Aboriginal and Torres Strait Islander fertility rates have stayed above replacement levels even as the nation's has declined rapidly.

Immigration and country of birth

In 2019, 30% of the Australian resident population, or 7,529,570 people, were born overseas.

Australia's population has quadrupled since the end of World War I, much of this increase from immigration. Australia has the world's eighth-largest immigrant population, with immigrants accounting for 30% of the population, a higher proportion than in any other nation with a population of over 10 million. Most immigrants are skilled, but the immigration quota includes categories for family members and refugees.

The following table shows Australia's population by country of birth as estimated by the Australian Bureau of Statistics in 2021. It shows only countries or regions or birth with a population of over 100,000 residing in Australia.

Religion

At the 2021 Census, 38.9% of the population identified as having "no religion", up from 15.5% in 2001. The largest religion is Christianity (43.9% of the population). The largest Christian denominations are the Roman Catholic Church (20% of the population) and the Anglican Church of Australia (9.8%). Multicultural immigration since the Second World War has led to the growth of non-Christian religions, the largest of which are Islam (3.2%), Hinduism (2.7%), Buddhism (2.4%), Sikhism (0.8%), and Judaism (0.4%).

The Australian Bureau of Statistics 2001 Census Dictionary statement on religious affiliation states the purpose for gathering such information:

Historically, Australian Aboriginal religion and mythology was the prevalent belief system in Australia until around 1840, when European Australians first outnumbered indigenous Australians. For a period, in the 19th and 20th centuries, Australia was majority Protestant with a large Catholic minority. Catholics first outnumbered Anglicans in the 1986 census. As a result of this history, while Australia has no official religion and "no religion" constitutes the largest group by religious identification, the various governments of Australia refer to the Christian God in their ceremonies, as do the various Australian Courts.

As in many Western countries, the level of active participation in religious services is lower than would be indicated by the proportion of the population identifying themselves as affiliated with a religion; weekly attendance at Christian church services is about 1.5 million, or about 7.5% of the population. Christian charitable organisations, hospitals and schools play a prominent role in welfare and education services. The Catholic education system is the second biggest sector after government schools, with more than 650,000 students (and around 21 per cent of all secondary school enrolments).

Language

The vast majority of Australians speak English at home, with the exception of Aboriginal Australians and first-generation immigrants.
Although Australia has no official language, English has always been the de facto national language and the only common tongue. Australian English is a major variety of the language, with a distinctive accent and lexicon, and differs slightly from other varieties of English in grammar and spelling. General Australian serves as the standard variety.

At the 2021 census English was the only language spoken in the homes of 72% of the population. The next most common languages spoken at home are Mandarin Chinese (2.7%), Arabic (1.4%), Vietnamese (1.3%), Cantonese (1.2%), and Punjabi (0.9%). Considerable proportions of first- and second-generation immigrants are bilingual.

Over 250 Indigenous Australian languages are thought to have existed at the time of first European contact; fewer than 20 are still in daily use by all age groups. About 110 others are spoken exclusively by older people. At the time of the 2006 census, 52,000 Indigenous Australians, representing 12% of the Indigenous population, reported that they spoke an Indigenous language at home.

Australia has its own sign language, Auslan. It is the main language of about 5,500 deaf people.

Indigenous population

The earliest accepted timeline for the first arrivals of indigenous Australians to the continent of Australia places this human migration to at least 40,000 years ago.

These first inhabitants of Australia were generalised as hunter-gatherers, who over the course of many succeeding generations diversified widely throughout the continent and its nearby islands in over 500 different nations. Although their technical culture remained static—depending on wood, bone, and stone tools and weapons— they developed intricate agricultural systems and carefully managed their environment to ensure ongoing sustainability. In addition to this their spiritual lore (system of law) and social life was highly complex. Most spoke several languages, and nation groups sometimes linked widely scattered tribal groups. Aboriginal population density ranged from approximately one person per  along the coasts to  one person per  in the arid interior. Food procurement was usually a matter for the nuclear family, requiring an estimated 3 days of work per week.

Dutch navigators landed on the coasts of modern Western Australia and Queensland several times during the 17th century. Captain James Cook wrote that he claimed the east coast for Great Britain in 1770 while standing on Possession Island off the west coast of Cape York Peninsula. The west coast was later settled by Britain also. At that time, the indigenous population was estimated to have numbered between as few as 315,000 and as many as 1,100,000, divided into many tribes speaking many different languages.

Since the end of World War II, efforts have been made both by the government and by the public to be more responsive to Aboriginal rights and needs.

Today, most of Australia's Indigenous population live on the east coast of Australia, where almost 60% of Indigenous Australians live in New South Wales (208,476) and Queensland (188,954) which roughly represents 2–5% of those state's populations. The Northern Territory has an Indigenous population of almost 70,000 and represents about 30% of the total Northern Territory population.

States and territories

Historical population

Note that population estimates in the table below do not include the Aboriginal population before 1961. Estimates of Aboriginal population before European settlement range from 300,000 to one million, with archaeological finds indicating a sustainable maximum population of around 750,000. Where available, actual population figures from census years are included.

Total fertility rate from 1850 to 1899
The total fertility rate is the number of children born per woman. It is based on fairly good data for the entire period. Sources: Our World In Data and Gapminder Foundation.

The following figures show the total fertility rates since the first years of British colonisation.

Crude birth rates from 1860 to 1899
The crude birth rate is the total number of live births per 1,000 population in a year. Source: Australian Bureau of Statistics.

Historical distribution of the total population by age
Source: Australian Bureau of Statistics.

Historical median age of the population
Median age of the Australia population through history. Source: Australian Bureau of Statistics.

Vital statistics since 1900
Source:

Current vital statistics

https://www.abs.gov.au/statistics/people/population/national-state-and-territory-population/sep-2022/310101.xlsx

In 2012, the total fertility rate of Australian-born women was 1.94, while for overseas-born women, it was 1.81, while in 2013, it was 1.91 and 1.79 respectively.
In 2017, TFR was 1.68 for overseas women (overseas father 1.73) and 1.78 for native women (native father 1.69).

Structure of the population

Life expectancy at birth from 1921 to 2015 

Sources: Our World In Data and the United Nations.

Source: Our World in Data

Source: UN World Population Prospects

Other general demographic statistics
As of February 2018, the population growth rate was 0.9%. This rate was based on estimates of (April 2019):

one birth every 1 minute and 41 seconds,
one death every 3 minutes and 20 seconds,
one migrant person arriving to live in Australia every 56 seconds,
one Australian resident leaving Australia to live overseas every 1 minute and 53 seconds, leading to
an overall total population increase of one person every 1 minute and 13 seconds.

Much of the data that follows has been derived from the CIA World Factbook and the Australian Bureau of Statistics, through censuses.

Population

The following figures are ABS estimates for the resident population of Australia, based on the 2001 and 2006 Censuses and other data.
 (as of   )
23,470,145 (July 2018 est.)
23,232,413 (July 2017 est.)
 21,262,641 (July 2009 – CIA World Factbook)

Age structure

0–14 years: 17.75% (male 2,138,080 /female 2,027,583)
15–24 years: 12.62% (male 1,520,528 /female 1,442,461)
25–54 years: 41.35% (male 4,944,587 /female 4,760,752)
55–64 years: 11.84% (male 1,379,681 /female 1,398,177)
65 years and over: 16.44% (male 1,786,595 /female 2,071,701) (2018 est.)

0–14 years: 17.8% (male 2,122,139/female 2,012,670)
15–24 years: 12.79% (male 1,524,368/female 1,446,663)
25–54 years: 41.45% (male 4,903,130/female 4,725,976)
55–64 years: 11.83% (male 1,363,331/female 1,384,036)
65 years and over: 16.14% (male 1,736,951/female 2,013,149) (2017 est.)

Median age

total: 38.8 years. Country comparison to the world: 58th
male: 38.1 years 
female: 39.7 years (2018 est.)

Total: 36.9 years
Male: 36.6 years
Female: 38.1 years (2009 est.)

Birth rate
12 births/1,000 population (2018 est.) Country comparison to the world: 165th
12.1 births/1,000 population (2017 est.)
12.47 births/1,000 population (2009 est.) (Rank 164)

Death rate
7.3 deaths/1,000 population (2018 est.) Country comparison to the world: 118th
6.68 deaths/1,000 population (2009 est.) (Rank 146)

Total fertility rate
1.77 children born/woman (2018 est.) Country comparison to the world: 155th

Net migration rate
5.4 migrant(s)/1,000 population (2018 est.) Country comparison to the world: 22nd
5.5 migrant(s)/1,000 population (2017 est.) (Rank 21)
6.23 migrant(s)/1,000 population. (2009 est.) (Rank 15)

Population growth rate
1.01% (2018 est.) Country comparison to the world: 107th
1.03% (2017 est.)

Mother's mean age at first birth
28.7 years (2014 est.)

Life expectancy at birth
total population: 82.4 years (2018 estimate)
male: 79.9 years (2018 estimate)
female: 85 years (2018 estimate)

At the time of Australian Federation in 1901, the rate of natural increase was 14.9 persons per 1,000 population. The rate increased to a peak of 17.4 per thousand population in the years 1912, 1913 and 1914. During the Great Depression, the rate declined to a low of 7.1 per thousand population in 1934 and 1935. Immediately after World War II, the rate increased sharply as a result of the start of the post–World War II baby boom and the immigration of many young people who then had children in Australia. A rate plateau of over 13.0 persons per 1,000 population occurred for every year from 1946 to 1962.

There has been a fall in the rate of natural increase since 1962 due to falling fertility. In 1971, the rate of natural increase was 12.7 persons per 1,000 population; a decade later it had fallen to 8.5. In 1996 the rate of natural increase fell below seven for the first time, with the downward trend continuing in the late 1990s.  Population projections by the Australian Bureau of Statistics indicate that continued low fertility, combined with the increase in deaths from an ageing population, will result in natural increase falling below zero sometime in the mid-2030s. However, in 2006 the fertility rate rose to 1.81, one of the highest rates in the OECD.

Since 1901, the crude death rate has fallen from about 12.2 deaths per 1,000 population, to 6.4 deaths per 1,000 population in 2006.

Urbanisation
urban population: 86% of total population (2018)
rate of urbanisation: 1.43% annual rate of change (2015–20 est.)

 Urbanisation population: 89% of total population (2008)
 Rate of urbanisation: 1.2% annual rate of change (2005–2010)

Sex ratio
Birth: 1.06 males/female
Under 15 years: 1.05 males/female
15–64 years: 1.03 males/female
65 years and over: 0.84 male/female
Total population: 1 male/female (2009)

Dependency ratios
total dependency ratio: 51.1
youth dependency ratio: 28.5
elderly dependency ratio: 22.6
potential support ratio: 4.4 (2015 est.)

HIV/AIDS

Adult prevalence rate: 0.1% (2017 est.)
People living with HIV/AIDS: 26,000 (2017 est.)
Deaths: fewer than 200 (2017 est.)

School life expectancy (primary to tertiary education)
total: 23 years 
male: 23 years 
female: 23 years (2016)

Unemployment, youth ages 15–24
total: 12.6%. Country comparison to the world: 105th
male: 13.7% 
female: 11.5% (2017 est.)

Incarceration and punishment

In March 2019, there were 43,320 adults imprisoned in Australia, which was an incarceration rate of 221 prisoners per 100,000 adult population., or 169 per 100,000 total population. Additionally, there was 75,544 people in community corrections (various non-custodial punishments such as parole, bail, probation and community service).

In June 2018, there was about 980 minors imprisoned in Australia on an average night.

Literacy
Definition: aged 15 years and over can read and write
Total population: 99%
Male: 99%
Female: 99% (2003 est.)

Education expenditure
4.9% of GDP (2013)
country comparison to the world: 55

Population density
This makes Australia the 3rd least densely populated country in the world, after Namibia and Mongolia.

See also

Notes

References

Citations

Sources 
 General references

Further reading
 Jupp, James. The Australian People: An Encyclopedia of the Nation, its People and their Origins (2002)
 O'Farrell, Patrick. The Irish in Australia: 1798 to the Present Day (3rd ed. Cork University Press, 2001)
 Wells, Andrew, and Theresa Martinez, eds. Australia's Diverse Peoples: A Reference Sourcebook (ABC-CLIO, 2004)

External links

 Australian Bureau of Statistics (ABS) Year Book Australia, 2009–10
 Australian population: ethnic origins (DOC)
 Build Australian population graph 1960 – 2013 (World Bank data)
 Build Australian population projection graph till 2100 (United Nation data)
 Build Australian life expectancy at birth graph 1950 – 2013 (United Nation data)
  Australia's population clock